The 1946 Maryville Scots football team represented the Maryville College during the 1946 college football season.  Under 23rd-year head coach Lombe Honaker, the Scots compiled a 9–1, went undefeated in the regular season for the first and only time in program history, shut out five of their ten opponents, and kept all but one from scoring more than 7 points, and outscored their opponents by a total of 217 to 52. They were invited to the first annual Tangerine Bowl, where they lost to Catawba, 31–6, on New Year's Day.

Schedule

References

Maryville
Maryville Scots football seasons
Maryville Scots football